Anand Ahirwar (born 1 July 1964) is an Indian politician from the Indian National Congress party.

Career
He was a member of the Indian 10th Lok Sabha (1991–1996) from Sagar constituency. 
In present he is a Chairman of Madhya Pradesh SC Welfare Department (15 March 2020) He was pulled by Central Information Commission for not paying his phone bills later.

See also

 List of people from Madhya Pradesh

References

1964 births
India MPs 1991–1996
Living people
Lok Sabha members from Madhya Pradesh
People from Sagar, Madhya Pradesh
Indian National Congress politicians from Madhya Pradesh